Syntheciidae is a family of cnidarians belonging to the order Leptothecata.

Genera:
 Hincksella Billard, 1918
 Parathuiaria Leloup, 1974
 Synthecium Allman, 1872

References

Leptothecata
Cnidarian families